A raion (often translated as "district";) in Ukraine is the second-level administrative division in the country. Raions were created in a 1922 administrative reform of the Soviet Union, to which Ukraine, as the Ukrainian Soviet Socialist Republic, belonged.

On 17 July 2020, the Verkhovna Rada (Ukraine's parliament) approved an administrative reform to merge most of the 490 raions, along with the "cities of regional significance", which were previously outside the raions, into just 136 reformed raions. Most tasks of the raions (education, healthcare, sport facilities, culture, and social welfare) were taken over by new hromadas, the subdivisions of raions. The 136 new districts include ten in Crimea, which have been de facto outside Ukrainian control since the start of the Russo-Ukrainian War in 2014.

Terminology

Districts of cities

Some cities of oblast subordination, along with the two cities of national significance (Kyiv and Sevastopol), are also divided in city raions, also called urban raions. City raions have their own local administration and are subordinated directly to a city. They may contain other cities, towns, and villages.

July 2020 reform 
On 17 July 2020, the number of raions in Ukraine was reduced to 136 from the previous 490.

List 
Source: New rayons(sic): maps and structure and with maps
Note: the Russian Republic of Crimea continues to use the same administrative divisions. Raions located in the occupied Donbass territories (see below in grey) are currently  only de jure.

Autonomous Republic of Crimea
Following the 2014 Crimean crisis, the Autonomous Republic of Crimea was annexed by Russia as the Republic of Crimea.

The populations in the table are from the latest census, the Ukrainian Census (2001).

Changes
 Nyzhnohirskyi Raion merged into Bilohirsk Raion.
 Yevpatoria Raion (new) created from Saky Raion, Chornomorske Raion, and Yevpatoria.
 Kerch Raion (new) created from Kerch and Lenine Raion.
 Perekop Raion (new) created from Krasnoperekopsk, Armiansk, Krasnoperekopsk Raion, and Rozdolne Raion.
 Dzhankoi Raion included the city of Dzhankoi.
 Simferopol Raion included the city of Simferopol.
 Feodosia (new) created from Sovietskyi Raion, Kirovske Raion, Feodosia, and Sudak.
 Yalta Raion (new) created from Yalta and Alushta.

Other oblasts

See also
 Administrative divisions of Ukraine

Notes

References

External links
 2001 Ukrainian census, Population Structure 
 Regions of Ukraine and its composition 

 
Subdivisions of Ukraine
Ukraine 2
Raions